"Snowdome" is the eighth single from Japanese pop singer Kaela Kimura, released as the third single from her number-one album, Scratch, on January 17, 2007. It peaked at number six on the Japan Oricon singles chart.

Track listing

References

2007 singles
Kaela Kimura songs
Songs written by Kaela Kimura
2007 songs